Jiun-Shyan Chen is an American engineer, currently the William Prager Chair Professor in Structural Mechanics at University of California, San Diego, and a publisher author. He is also Elected President for American Society of Civil Engineers's Engineering Mechanics Institute, as well as being a Fellow at ASCE since 2013. He was also formerly the Chancellor's Professor in Civil & Environmental Engineering at University of California, Los Angeles.

References

Living people
University of California, San Diego faculty
American writers
National Central University alumni
Northwestern University alumni
University of Iowa faculty
UCLA Henry Samueli School of Engineering and Applied Science faculty
21st-century American engineers
Engineers from California
Year of birth missing (living people)